Riivo Sinijärv (born 27 May 1947 in Tallinn) is an Estonian politician and a former Minister of Foreign Affairs.

Sinijärv is the father of poet and journalist Karl Martin Sinijärv.

References

1947 births
Living people
Politicians from Tallinn
Ministers of the Interior of Estonia
Ministers of Foreign Affairs of Estonia
University of Tartu alumni
Recipients of the Order of the White Star, 3rd Class
20th-century Estonian politicians
21st-century Estonian politicians
Members of the Riigikogu, 1992–1995